Kinderkulevo (Kinderkül) is a rural locality (a village) in Chekmagushevsky District, Bashkortostan, Russia. The population was 245 as of 2010. There are 4 streets.

Geography 
Kinderkulevo is located 24 km southeast of Chekmagush (the district's administrative centre) by road. Novoikhsanovo is the nearest rural locality.

References 

Rural localities in Chekmagushevsky District